The 2017 British Grand Prix (formally known as the 2017 Formula 1 Rolex British Grand Prix) was a Formula One motor race that took place on 16 July 2017 at the Silverstone Circuit in Silverstone, United Kingdom. This race was the seventy-second running of the British Grand Prix, the sixty-eighth time that the race has been run as a World Championship event, and the fifty-first time that the World Championship event has been held at the Silverstone Circuit. 

Ferrari driver Sebastian Vettel entered the round with a twenty-point lead over Mercedes's Lewis Hamilton in the Drivers' Championship. Mercedes led Ferrari by thirty-three points in the Constructors' Championship.

The race was dominated and won by Lewis Hamilton, who achieved a grand slam: starting from pole position, leading every lap of the race, setting fastest lap, and winning with a 14-second lead over Mercedes teammate Valtteri Bottas. 

With his fifth British Grand Prix win, Hamilton equalled the records of Alain Prost and Jim Clark, who won the race five times each. His championship rival Sebastian Vettel suffered a tyre failure with two laps to go and finished seventh. As a result, Vettel's lead over Hamilton in the Drivers' standings was cut down to one point. Kimi Räikkönen, Vettel's teammate, suffered the same problem while in second position and lost his place to Bottas, and managed to finish third.

Report

Background
On 11 July 2017, the BRDC, the owners of Silverstone, activated a break clause in their contract meaning unless a new contract is signed, 2019 will be the final year the British Grand Prix takes place at Silverstone.

As the race was on the week of the British premiere of Cars 3, there was a special pit garage for Lightning McQueen and Jackson Storm. McQueen's voice actor, Owen Wilson, was in attendance, alongside director Brian Fee and producer Kevin Reher. They visited the garages of Lewis Hamilton, Sebastian Vettel, and Fernando Alonso, who voice the English, German, and Spanish voices of the built-in voice command assistant Hamilton. Wilson also experienced the Silverstone circuit with a ride in the F1 Experiences two-seater car.

Practice

The first free practice session saw the public début of the "shield" cockpit protection device, a reinforced perspex crash structure mounted to the monocoque. The shield is designed to provide additional driver protection by deflecting debris away from a driver's head without compromising the ability of marshalls to access the cockpit in the event of an accident. Sebastian Vettel responded negatively to the design, cutting short his testing of the device and subsequently reporting that the concave shape of the shield distorted his vision and made him feel dizzy.

Mercedes's Valtteri Bottas went fastest in first practice, setting a time of 1:29.106. He was followed by his teammate Lewis Hamilton and the Red Bull of Max Verstappen in second and third. In second practice, Bottas was fastest followed by Hamilton and Räikkönen. Saturday's third and final practice was topped by Hamilton, with Vettel second and Bottas third. Hamilton set the quickest time of all three practices with a 1:28.063, closely followed by Vettel who set a 1:28.095.

Qualifying
Q1 was affected by rain and most drivers used intermediate tyres. Daniel Ricciardo's Red Bull experienced a turbo failure, ending his qualifying run. Fernando Alonso opted to change to supersoft tyres during the final minutes of Q1 as the track dried. He subsequently set the fastest time of the session, a 1:37.598.

In Q3, Lewis Hamilton secured pole position with a 1:26.600, 0.547 seconds quicker than Kimi Räikkönen in second, and 0.756 seconds quicker than Vettel in third. Nico Hülkenberg gave Renault team its best qualifying result since its return to F1 in 2016, with fifth. Hamilton's pole equalled Jim Clark's record for most poles at the British Grand Prix. Valtteri Bottas set the fourth fastest time during Q3 but started from ninth position after being set back five places as a result of an unauthorised gearbox change. Subsequently, Max Verstappen started fourth.

Race
In the formation lap Jolyon Palmer suffered a hydraulic failure and retired from the race. Another formation lap was held and thus the grand prix was shortened to 51 laps instead of the scheduled 52 laps.

At the start, Hamilton easily pulled away opening a 1.6 seconds gap to Räikkönen after just one lap. Sebastian Vettel, starting from third, was overtaken by Max Verstappen. Valtteri Bottas started his slow run towards what would become a second place, overtaking both McLaren Honda driver Stoffel Vandoorne and Sergio Pérez in a Force India, who started from eight and sixth respectively. 
A crash of the Toro Rosso drivers Carlos Sainz Jr. and Daniil Kvyat, caused by Kvyat, brought out the safety car on lap 2, with Sainz retiring while Kvyat continued but finished the race only fifteenth after receiving a drive-through penalty.

At the restart, once again Hamilton pulled away and, in the following laps, opened a gap towards second placed Kimi Räikkönen which allowed him to cruise to victory. Meanwhile, Bottas continued his charge and got up to fifth place before lap 7, overtaking Esteban Ocon and Nico Hülkenberg.
Vettel, after the restart, was stuck behind the Red Bull of Max Verstappen and the two banged wheels as Vettel tried to overtake. Verstappen stayed in third but Vettel eventually got out in front of him after he pitted on lap 18, one lap earlier than Verstappen.

Bottas, who was the only one of the top ten who started on the slower but more durable soft tyres instead of supersoft versions, stayed out until lap 32 and then pitted for the supersoft tyres. As he set fastest lap he soon caught up to Vettel and overtook him on lap 44, moving up into third.
Meanwhile, Daniel Ricciardo, who started from 19th on the grid, also moved up, overtaking, among others, Fernando Alonso, Sergio Pérez and Kevin Magnussen. He eventually finished fifth.

In the final laps, both Ferraris suffered punctures. On lap 49 Kimi Räikkönen suffered a puncture on his left front tyre. With a relatively short distance to the pits, Räikkönen only lost second place to Bottas and still managed to finish third. Vettel's puncture came on lap 51 with almost the entire lap remaining to return to the pits with a blown tire. Losing a significant amount of time, the blow out dropped him down to seventh place.

As a result of the race, Hamilton narrowed the gap to Vettel in the Drivers' Championship to just one point, while Mercedes expanded their lead in the Constructors' Championship to 55 points over Ferrari.

The result marked Hamilton's fifth career grand slam. Additionally, Hamilton equalled the record for most British Grand Prix wins held jointly by Alain Prost and Jim Clark.

Classification

Qualifying

Notes
 – Valtteri Bottas received a five-place grid penalty for an unscheduled gearbox change.
 – Fernando Alonso received a thirty-place grid penalty for use of additional power unit elements.
 – Daniel Ricciardo received a five-place grid penalty for an unscheduled gearbox change and a ten-place grid penalty for use of additional power unit elements.

Race

Notes
 – Jolyon Palmer did not line up on the grid as a result of a hydraulic failure on the first formation lap.

Championship standings after the race 

Drivers' Championship standings

Constructors' Championship standings

 Note: Only the top five positions are included for both sets of standings.

See also
 2017 Silverstone Formula 2 round
 2017 Silverstone GP3 Series round

References

External links

British
British Grand Prix
Grand Prix
British Grand Prix
Grand Prix